WKVP (106.9 FM, "K-LOVE") is a non-commercial FM radio station licensed to Camden, New Jersey, serving the Philadelphia media market. The station is owned and operated by Educational Media Foundation and is an affiliate of K-LOVE, EMF's contemporary Christian music network. Its broadcast tower is located on Mount Ephraim Avenue in Camden.

Station history

1959-1968: MOR
The station signed on the air on December 31, 1959 as WKDN-FM. In 1966, the station was airing a MOR music format and was co-owned with WKDN (800 AM), which changed calls to WTMR after the two stations were sold to separate owners in 1968.

1968-2012: Religious
Family Stations, Inc., the holding company for stations run by Harold Camping's Family Radio religious ministry, acquired WKDN-FM for $500,000 on July 23, 1968. Under Family Stations' ownership, programming on WKDN (the "-FM" suffix was dropped from the call sign in June 1986) consisted mainly of Christian radio and teachings from Family Radio, along with some public affairs programming on weekends.

On December 6, 2011, Merlin Media, LLC announced it would acquire WKDN from Family Radio, a sale that was completed on March 6, 2012. After the sale, Family Radio continued to program WKDN through a local marketing agreement while Merlin constructed new facilities for the station.

2012-2013: Talk

Family Radio programming ceased on WKDN at precisely Midnight on the morning of April 16, 2012; after about a half-hour of dead air, a continuous playing loop of "It's the End of the World as We Know It (And I Feel Fine)" by R.E.M. began, likely a play on Camping's infamous rapture predictions. After 12 Noon on April 16, the station changed its stunt to round-the-clock airings of The Sean Hannity Show (live airings and repeats), complete with the branding of "Hannity @ 106.9."  With this "all-Hannity" change, the station also adopted a new call sign, WWIQ. (Family Radio would move the WKDN call sign to its State College, Pennsylvania station on April 23.)

Early speculation after Merlin's purchase had WWIQ being converted to an all-news format, replicating Merlin-owned stations WEMP in New York City and WWWN/WIQI in Chicago.  Merlin, however, would go instead with a combination of news and talk radio for the station, an approach confirmed on May 7, 2012. The station took the branding of "IQ 106.9" (for "Intelligence quotient"), and intended to go after CBS Radio's mainstay stations in Philadelphia, KYW (all-news) and WPHT (talk), with a combination of news, information, and conservative-leaning talk that at times would have an irreverent, us-against-them tone. "IQ's" approach was confirmed by both a welcome statement on its website and by a YouTube video posted by the man who would be one of "IQ's" original local hosts, former Philadelphia TV anchor Larry Mendte; in the video, Mendte took aim at other Philly media outlets (namely the "definite agenda" of KYW and WPHT) and called WWIQ "a fresh new voice in the city of Philadelphia, an important alternative."

Though "IQ 106.9" did include local weekday programming (see below), it relied heavily on nationally syndicated content, including three shows distributed by Premiere Networks: Sean Hannity Show, Glenn Beck Program, and The Rush Limbaugh Show; Limbaugh joined "IQ 106.9" on June 25, 2012 after previously being heard on WPHT (rumors of that move first surfaced the previous April, when Premiere announced that it would pull Limbaugh from WPHT, a station that previously also aired Hannity and Beck).  "IQ" would later add The Mark Levin Show in July 2012, and by January 2013 would round out its syndicated schedule with the addition of Michael Savage's The Savage Nation, The John Batchelor Show, and Red Eye Radio, all 3 of which are syndicated by Cumulus Media Networks (as is Mark Levin).

Local content on "IQ 106.9" included "Philly's Morning News," a combination news/talk show (5AM-9AM) initially co-hosted by Larry Mendte and Al Gardner; a radio veteran and Philadelphia native, Gardner was hired by Merlin Media in December 2011 to program "IQ," arriving from a morning host position at WBT/Charlotte.  Mendte would be dropped from WWIQ on December 31, 2012, with the host claiming in retrospect that his tenure at "IQ" was "a big experiment" ("IQ's" overall ratings dropped by half during the period after Mendte's firing, from a 3.6 rating in November to 1.8 in January, though these ratings reflect the entire programming week and refer to all listeners ages 12 and above.) New York City-based radio commentator Lionel would fill Mendte's seat on "Philly's Morning News" alongside Al Gardner until Gardner was released from the station in March 2013, after which Michelle Murillo would join Lionel. "Philly's Morning News" would be dropped altogether in mid-July 2013 in favor of the Cumulus-distributed Imus in the Morning with Don Imus, making "IQ's" weekday schedule all-national in nature.

2013-present: Christian contemporary
On August 7, 2013, Merlin Media announced that it had reached a deal to sell WWIQ to Educational Media Foundation (EMF). The sale, which would be consummated on November 19, 2013 at a reported price of $20.25 million, would mean a return to religious-themed programming on the 106.9 signal, as EMF intended to move its K-LOVE contemporary Christian music network to the signal. K-LOVE had been heard in Philadelphia on WKVP (89.5 FM) in Cherry Hill, New Jersey, whose 1,900-watt signal provides only a rimshot signal to the city.  The sale of WWIQ would leave Merlin with operations in only one radio market, Chicago, where it owns alternative rock station WKQX and classic rock station WLUP-FM and also operates alternative rock outlet WKQX through a local marketing agreement; Merlin would exit the Chicago market a few months later.

Merlin would continue to program "IQ" as a talk station until November 3, 2013. During "IQ's" last week, part of its daily schedule was turned over to Glenn Beck's online network TheBlaze, in part to promote that network's Philadelphia-focused content as well as to fill air time caused by the early departures of The Rush Limbaugh Show and Sean Hannity Show, who moved from WWIQ back to WPHT on October 28.  "IQ" and its talk format ended just before midnight on November 3, 2013, after which time the station relaunched as a K-LOVE affiliate. (EMF gained authorization from the Federal Communications Commission on October 23 to convert WWIQ to non-commercial educational status.) EMF would move the WKVP call sign to 106.9 on November 5; the call sign's former home, at 89.5 FM in Cherry Hill, is now WYPA, an Air 1 affiliate.

Signal and facilities
From the first sign-on until April 16, 2012, WKDN transmitted from a broadcast tower located in Camden, New Jersey, approximately 12 miles southeast of most other Philadelphia FM signals; as a result, the station enjoyed a better than average signal in southern New Jersey, especially in the Jersey Shore counties of Atlantic, Monmouth, Ocean, and Cape May. Under Family Radio, WKDN also operated three FM translator stations: W207AB (89.3 FM) in Atlantic City, New Jersey; W207AE (89.3 FM) in Reading, Pennsylvania; and W249AA (97.7 FM) in Lebanon, Pennsylvania. These translators were not part of the station's sale to Merlin. W207AB and W207AE continue to broadcast Family Radio programming through a satellite feed of its Sacramento station, KEBR. (W249AA currently simulcasts WLEB-LP.) WKDN's studios under Family Radio ownership were located at 2906 Mt. Ephraim Avenue in Haddon Township, New Jersey.

At the "IQ 106.9" debut on April 16, 2012, the station transmitted from a broadcast tower located on the spire of One Liberty Place in Center City with an effective radiated power (ERP) of 9,000 watts at a height above average terrain (HAAT) of 244 meters. This site is licensed as an auxiliary transmitting facility, but it was expected to eventually be licensed as the station's primary transmitting facility, subject to whether EMF carries through on Merlin's previous applications.

Translators
The following translator simulcasts the programming of WKVP:

See also
Other K-LOVE stations in Pennsylvania include:
 WKHL (FM), Palmyra, PA
 WKHW (FM), Halifax, PA
 WKPA, State College, PA
 WLKA, Scranton, PA
 WLKJ, Johnstown, PA
 WLVX, Greenville, PA
 WPKV, Pittsburgh, PA

References

External links

K-Love radio stations
Radio stations established in 1959
1959 establishments in New Jersey
Educational Media Foundation radio stations
KVP
Mass media in Camden, New Jersey